Defending champion Robert Wrenn defeated Manliffe Goodbody in the challenge round, 6–8, 6–1, 6–4, 6–4 to win the men's singles tennis title at the 1894 U.S. National Championships. Goodbody became the first player from outside the United States to reach the challenge round.

Draw

Challenge round

Finals

Earlier rounds

Section 1

Section 2

Section 3

Section 4

References

Sources
 

Men's singles
1894